Iain Frederick Phillip (born 14 February 1951 in Dundee) is a Scottish former footballer who played in defence. Phillip made over 400 league appearances during his eighteen-year playing career. He won the Scottish League Cup with each of the Dundee clubs and three times in total. He also played for Crystal Palace, Raith Rovers and Arbroath.

Honours
Dundee:
Scottish League Cup: 1973–74
Dundee United:
Scottish League Cup: 1979–80, 1980–81

References

External links

1951 births
Living people
Scottish footballers
Dundee F.C. players
Crystal Palace F.C. players
Dundee United F.C. players
Raith Rovers F.C. players
Arbroath F.C. players
Footballers from Dundee
Association football defenders
Scottish Football League players
Scottish Football League representative players
English Football League players
Scotland under-23 international footballers
People from Broughty Ferry